Kotli Kalan is a village in Pabbi Tehsil of Nowshera District of Khyber Pukhtunkhwa.

References

Populated places in Nowshera District
Nowshera District